Michael Haydn's Symphony No. 3 in G major, also known as Divertimento in G major, Sherman 3, MH 26, was written in Oradea (then known as Großwardein) in 1763, according to the Göttweig catalog. It is not listed in the Perger catalog. Wolfgang Amadeus Mozart's Salzburg Symphonies (K136-138) are examples of symphonies that were also called divertimenti (Guy, 1999).

Scored for 2 oboes, 2 bassoons, 2 horns, strings and continuo, in four movements:

Allegro molto
Andante 
Menuetto e Trio
Presto

References
 Elisabeth Guy, booklet for Michael Haydn: 20 Symphonies cpo 999591-2
 Charles H. Sherman and T. Donley Thomas, Johann Michael Haydn (1737 - 1806), a chronological thematic catalogue of his works. Stuyvesant, New York: Pendragon Press (1993)
 C. Sherman, "Johann Michael Haydn" in The Symphony: Salzburg, Part 2 London: Garland Publishing (1982): lxiii

Symphony 03
1763 compositions
Compositions in G major